Lucy Kate Beere  is a Guernsey international lawn and indoor bowler.

Bowls career

Outdoors
She has represented Guernsey at four Commonwealth Games; competing in the 2010 Commonwealth Games in Delhi, the 2014 Commonwealth Games in Glasgow, the 2018 Commonwealth Games in the Gold Coast and the 2022 Commonwealth Games in Birmingham where she won a silver medal in the singles event.

In 2019, she won the singles and pairs silver medal at the Atlantic Bowls Championships and during the same year she won three gold medals at the European Bowls Championships.

In 2020, she was selected for the 2020 World Outdoor Bowls Championship in Australia.

In 2022, she competed in the women's singles and the women's pairs at the 2022 Commonwealth Games. At the Games, Beere won Guernsey's first medal in 28 years, by winning the silver medal in the singles event where she lost by 21 shots to 17 in the final to Australian Ellen Ryan.

Indoors
In 2018 she defeated Rebecca Van Asch in the final of the World Cup Singles and has finished runner-up twice.

Honours
Beere was appointed Member of the Order of the British Empire (MBE) in the 2023 New Year Honours for services to bowls on Guernsey.

References

1982 births
Living people
Guernsey female bowls players
Bowls players at the 2010 Commonwealth Games
Bowls players at the 2014 Commonwealth Games
Bowls players at the 2018 Commonwealth Games
Bowls players at the 2022 Commonwealth Games
Commonwealth Games silver medallists for Guernsey
Bowls European Champions
Sportspeople from the Isle of Wight
Commonwealth Games medallists in lawn bowls
Members of the Order of the British Empire
Medallists at the 2022 Commonwealth Games